Marian Stafford (February 7, 1931 – August 16, 1984) was an American actress and model. She was Playboy magazine's Playmate of the Month for the March 1956 issue. Her centerfold was photographed by Ruth Sondak, and was the first to consist of three pages.

In addition to posing for other men's magazines in the decade, Stafford became a popular personality during the so-called Golden Age of Television. She was a regular on game shows such as Treasure Hunt and The $64,000 Question. She was crowned Miss Color TV of 1956 by NBC.

Stafford died on August 16, 1984, at the age of 53.  She was survived by her husband, television writer and producer, Robert Foshko.

References

External links

1931 births
1984 deaths
1950s Playboy Playmates
20th-century American actresses